Dame Norma Redfearn  is a Labour politician serving as the directly-elected Mayor of North Tyneside.

Early life
Redfearn was born in Wallsend. The daughter of a shipyard worker, she graduated with a BPhil from Newcastle University.

Teaching career 
Redfearn had a 30-year career in primary and secondary education. After a variety of teaching jobs, she left Wharrier Street Juniors in June 1986, where she was deputy head, to head West Walker Primary School, east of Newcastle upon Tyne. She stayed there until July 2000. In June 1989 the school won an award from the Royal Institute of British Architects for its playground design, presented to Redfearn and a pupil by Charles III. then the Prince of Wales. In 1997, she became the first headteacher to receive the prize for Public Management Leadership from the Office for Public Management.

North Tyneside Council
Redfearn was elected to North Tyneside Council for the seat of Riverside ward in 2004 where she served until her election as mayor. After the election of John Harrison as the Mayor of North Tyneside in 2005, Redfearn served as the Cabinet Member for Children and Young People on North Tyneside Council. She held the position until 2009 when Harrison lost his re-election campaign. During her time as Cabinet Member for Children and Young People she is credited with introducing breakfast clubs for children across the borough.

Following Harrison's defeat to Conservative Linda Arkley, Redfearn sought the nomination to become Labour's candidate for Mayor. In February 2012 she was formally selected as Labour's candidate for Mayor, defeating former Mayor Cllr John Harrison, former Deputy Mayor and then Leader of North Tyneside Labour Group Cllr Jim Allan, Cllr Ian Grayson, and Cllr Lesley Spillard. Redfearn would go on to defeat the Conservative incumbent Linda Arkley.

She won Mayor of North Tyneside 2013, on Thursday 2 May 2013, with 55.35% of the votes cast on a turnout of 32.07% and re-elected again on 4 May 2017 with an increased majority. She was re-elected for a third term on 6 May 2021.

Redfearn won re-election to the position of Elected Mayor of North Tyneside on 4 May 2017, defeating the Conservative candidate, Stewart Hay. When re-elected she became the first person to hold the position for two consecutive terms. 

In May 2018, Redfearn reshuffled her cabinet dismissing the former Mayor Harrison, among others, and bringing in new members including councillors Carl Johnson, Sarah Day, Steve Cox and Peter Earley. She made no changes to her Cabinet in 2019 or 2020.

In 2020, Redfearn publicly announced that she would be seeking a historic third term as Elected Mayor of North Tyneside. Redfearn said the said she counts the multi-million pound regeneration of Whitley Bay and The Spanish City as one of the things she has been proudest of during her second term in office. During Redfearn's second term, children's services in North Tyneside were rated 'outstanding' by Ofsted, the Council declared a Climate Emergency, and Forest Hall town centre receive major investment. As of 2017, Redfearn lives in North Shields.

Already Commander of the Order of the British Empire (CBE), Redfearn was appointed Dame Commander of the Order of the British Empire (DBE) in the 2023 New Year Honours for political and public service.

North of Tyne Combined Authority 
Redfearn was an ardent supporter of regional devolution and was one of the leading voices behind the creation of the North of Tyne Combined Authority. As a result, she was appointed Interim Mayor of the North of Tyne until an election took place, a role she held simultaneously with her post as Elected Mayor of North Tyneside. Following the 2019 North of Tyne mayoral election, Redfearn was appointed Deputy Mayor of North of the Tyne and the Cabinet member for Housing and Land by new North of Tyne Mayor Jamie Driscoll.

References

Alumni of Newcastle University
Labour Party (UK) councillors
Women mayors of places in England
Mayors of the Metropolitan Borough of North Tyneside
Labour Party (UK) mayors
Dames Commander of the Order of the British Empire
Living people
Year of birth missing (living people)
People from Wallsend
Politicians from Tyne and Wear
Women councillors in England